Peter Thrupp (born 23 December 1963) is an Australian former professional tennis player.

Thrupp turned professional in 1985 and reached a best singles world ranking of 316 during his career. He featured in the main draw of the 1985 Australian Open, where after a first round bye he was eliminated by American Jay Lapidus.

References

External links
 
 

1963 births
Living people
Australian male tennis players
Tennis players from Brisbane